Chen Jingjing (born 19 August 1975) is a former professional tennis player from China.

Chen, who had a career high ranking of 244, had her best performance on the WTA Tour at the 1995 Nokia Open in Beijing, where she beat fourth seed Karin Kschwendt to make the round of 16.

In 1996 she appeared in five Fed Cup ties for China, for a 6/2 record, winning three matches in both singles and doubles.

ITF finals

Singles (1–1)

Doubles (3–3)

See also
List of China Fed Cup team representatives

References

External links
 
 
 

1975 births
Living people
Chinese female tennis players
20th-century Chinese women
21st-century Chinese women